Sanford Dixon Bishop Jr. (born February 4, 1947) is an American lawyer and politician serving as the U.S. representative for , serving since 1993. He became the dean of Georgia's congressional delegation after the death of John Lewis. A member of the Blue Dog Coalition, he belongs to the conservative faction of the Democratic Party. His district is in southwestern Georgia and includes Albany, Thomasville, and most of Columbus and Macon.

Early life, education, and legal career
Bishop was born in Mobile, Alabama, to Minnie B. Slade and Sanford Dixon Bishop, the first president of Bishop State Community College. Bishop obtained a B.A. degree from Morehouse College in 1968, majoring in political science and minoring in English, and a J.D. degree from Emory University School of Law in 1971. At Morehouse, he was a classmate of Herman Cain. He served in the United States Army between 1969 and 1971. Bishop subsequently operated a law firm in Columbus, Georgia.

Bishop has received the Distinguished Eagle Scout Award from the Boy Scouts of America (BSA), given to Eagle Scouts for distinguished career achievement. He is a member of BSA's Order of the Arrow (OA) and as a youth was on the OA ceremonies team. He is a resident of Albany, Georgia, where he is a member of the Mount Zion Baptist Church. Bishop is a Life Member of Kappa Alpha Psi fraternity, initiated at Morehouse's Pi chapter. He is a Shriner and 33° Mason.

Georgia legislature
Bishop was elected to the Georgia House of Representatives in 1977, where he remained until being elected to the Georgia Senate in 1990.

U.S. House of Representatives

Elections

1992
After only one term in the state senate, he ran for the 2nd district in 1992, which was held by six-term U.S. Congressman Charles Hatcher, a white moderate Democrat. The 2nd had been reconfigured as a black-majority district during congressional apportionment following the 1990 Census. Bishop finished second behind Hatcher in a crowded six-way primary. Hatcher failed to reach the 50% threshold, and was forced into a runoff election. During the campaign Bishop attacked Hatcher for bouncing 819 checks in the House banking scandal. Bishop defeated him 53%–47%. In the general election, he defeated Republican Jim Dudley 64%–36%.

1994
In the Democratic primary, he defeated James Bush 67%–33%. In the general election, he won reelection to a second term with 66%.

1996
In 1995, a 5–4 majority of the Supreme Court ruled that the redistricting of Georgia had violated the equal protection clause of the Fourteenth Amendment to the United States Constitution. The 2nd district was thus redrawn. The newly redrawn district was 60% white. Nonetheless, Bishop won reelection to a third term with 54% of the vote.

1998
Bishop won reelection to a fourth term against Republican Joseph F. McCormick with 57% of the vote. During the campaign, Bishop received twice the campaign financing that his opponent raised.

2000
Bishop defeated Dylan Glenn, a young black Republican who received strong backing from many national Republican leaders. The vote was 53%–47%.

2002
Bishop won reelection to a sixth term unopposed.

2004
Bishop won reelection to a seventh term with 67% of the vote.

2006

He won reelection to an eighth term with 68% of the vote.

2008

Bishop won reelection to a ninth term with 69% of the vote.

2010

Bishop won reelection to a tenth term against Republican State Representative Mike Keown, 51%–49%, the closest margin of his career. In a year where the Democrats lost the majority in the House, The New York Times wrote that Bishop's reelection odds seemed slim because he was an "incumbent in an anti-Washington year", because he was a black man in a majority white district (49% White, 47% Black), and because of a scholarship scandal at his nonprofit.

2012

After redistricting, the 2nd district became a black-majority district. Notably, it added most of Macon, previously the heart of the 8th district. Bishop was heavily favored in the general election as a result. He defeated Republican John House with 63% of the vote.

Tenure

Bishop is a member of the Congressional Black Caucus, as well as the Blue Dog Democrats, a group of moderate to conservative House Democrats. Due to his willingness to work across the aisle, Bishop was ranked the 16th most bipartisan member of the 114th Congress. The ranking was part of the Bipartisan Index put forth by The Lugar Center in collaboration with Georgetown University. Serving a primarily agricultural district, Bishop has fought to preserve the federal price supports for peanuts, southwest Georgia's most important crop. The New York Times quoted the chairman of the agency that administers federal farm programs in Georgia as saying, "It's questionable whether it would have survived without the votes [Bishop] brought to it". In 1997, Bishop caused considerable controversy within his own party by cosponsoring a bill by U.S. Representative Ernest Istook to introduce a constitutional amendment to protect religious expression on public property, known as the H. J. Res, 78, the Religious Freedom Amendment. The wording of the amendment allowing the practice of religion on public property, most notably public schools:

To secure the people's fight to acknowledge God according to the dictates of conscience: The people's right to pray and to recognize their religious beliefs, heritage and traditions shall not be infringed. The Government shall not require any person to join in prayer or other religious activity, prescribe school prayers, discriminate against religion, or deny equal access to a benefit on account of religion ... The people's right to pray and to recognize their religious beliefs, heritage, or traditions on public property, including schools, shall not be infringed. 

On October 10, 2002, Bishop was one of only four of 36 Congressional Black Caucus members to vote for the joint resolution authorizing the Iraq War. The other three Congressional Black Caucus members who voted for the resolution are no longer members of Congress: Bill Jefferson, Albert Wynn, and Harold Ford Jr.

On September 10, 2007, Bishop endorsed Barack Obama for President and co-chaired the Georgia for Obama campaign; his wife, Vivian Creighton Bishop, a municipal court clerk in Columbus, co-chaired the Georgia Women for Hillary committee.

Bishop serves on the Appropriations Committee, and chairs the Subcommittee on Agriculture, Rural Development, Food and Drug Administration, and Related Agencies.

Controversies
In September 2010, the Associated Press reported that Bishop had, between 2003 and 2005, directed scholarships and awards funded by the Congressional Black Caucus to ineligible persons, including his stepdaughter, Aayesha Owens Reese; his niece, Emmaundia J. Whitaker; and other people with close ties to his family, threatening to turn the program into a political problem for the party. Ashton McRae released a statement by Bishop's office: "It is our understanding that the CBC Foundation in 2008 revisited the guidelines and processes for its scholarship programs, and as such, included language to clarify that CBC family members are not eligible to receive the scholarships. These scholarships ... were awarded prior to 2008." Ultimately Bishop's spokesman said he would repay the scholarship fund for any awards he made in violation of the rules. Citizens for Responsibility and Ethics in Washington mentioned Bishop in its annual Most Corrupt Members of Congress report in 2011.

In 1997, the Pigford v. Glickman lawsuit came out of legislative discrimination against black farmers. The case was led by Timothy Pigford and 400 black farmers. The Washington Times reported that by the end of the case in 1999, over 94,000 claims were filed in conjunction with the original case, "even though the U.S. Census Bureau never counted more than 33,000 black farmers in America during the years in question." In February 2011, three farmers brought allegations of fraud to Bishop, including Eddie Slaughter, vice president of the Black Farmers and Agriculturalists Association. Bishop told The Albany Herald that he was aware of fraud in the program, but that the settlement's anti-fraud provisions would prevent disbursement of funds to those who didn't qualify. Interviews with Slaughter have circulated online and criticism has been raised about his comments about fraud allegations leading to the end of the program.

In 2020, the Office of Congressional Ethics released a report alleging Bishop misused over $90,000 of campaign funds to cover personal expenses like fuel, golf expenses, meals, travel, tuition and entertainment. A full House Ethics Committee investigation was subsequently launched.

Committee assignments
Committee on Appropriations
Subcommittee on Agriculture, Rural Development, Food and Drug Administration, and Related Agencies (chair)
 Subcommittee on Financial Services and General Government
Subcommittee on Military Construction, Veterans Affairs, and Related Agencies

Caucus memberships
Congressional Black Caucus
Blue Dog Coalition
Congressional Diabetes Caucus
International Conservation Caucus
Sportsmen's Caucus
Congressional Cement Caucus
United States Congressional International Conservation Caucus
U.S.-Japan Caucus

Electoral history

Honors
2015 - Bishop was appointed as a Member of the Most Venerable Order of the Hospital of Saint John of Jerusalem by Queen Elizabeth II of the United Kingdom.

See also
List of African-American United States representatives

References

External links

Congressman Sanford Bishop Jr. official U.S. House website
Sanford Bishop for Congress

 

|-

|-

1947 births
20th-century American politicians
21st-century American politicians
African-American members of the United States House of Representatives
African-American United States Army personnel
African-American state legislators in Georgia (U.S. state)
Baptists from Alabama
Baptists from Georgia (U.S. state)
Baptists from the United States
Democratic Party members of the United States House of Representatives from Georgia (U.S. state)
Emory University School of Law alumni
Georgia (U.S. state) lawyers
Democratic Party Georgia (U.S. state) state senators
Lawyers from Mobile, Alabama
Living people
Democratic Party members of the Georgia House of Representatives
Military personnel from Mobile, Alabama
Morehouse College alumni
People from Albany, Georgia
People from Columbus, Georgia
Politicians from Mobile, Alabama
Serving Brothers of the Order of St John
United States Army officers
20th-century African-American politicians
African-American men in politics
21st-century African-American politicians